Philos Laboratories (also known as Philos Laboratories Software Developer Ltd. or Philos Labs and later Philos Entertainment, Inc) was a Hungarian computer software development company known for working with producer Ubisoft and CDV Software Entertainment.

The company was founded in 1995 by John (Zsolt) Vamosi, working mostly on making graphics for advertisements. In 1997, several developers of the game Perihelion: The Prophecy were hired, and they started making their first title, what would become Theocracy.

It was eventually disbanded in 2004, amid lawsuits of software piracy and much debated financial ventures.

Released titles
Theocracy (2000)
Tim7 (2001)
Rebels: Prison Escape (2003)

References

External links
Antal Ruttmayer of Philos Labs Interview (Eurogamer)
Escape from Alcatraz Q&A (Gamespot)

Companies disestablished in 2004
Defunct video game companies of Hungary
Software companies established in 1995
Video game development companies